Elisabeth Leonskaja (born 23 November 1945) (In Russian: Елизавета Ильинична Леонская) is a Soviet and Austrian pianist. She was born to a family of Jewish and Polish extraction living in Tbilisi, then the capital of the Georgian Soviet Socialist Republic.

When Leonskaja was six and a half, her parents were able to buy her her first upright piano. At 7, she passed the entrance to one of Tbilisi's sixty music schools. At 11, she gave her orchestral debut with Beethoven's Piano Concerto in C Major (Op. 15), at 13 her first solo recital. At 14, she began an intense four-year period of study at the secondary school with a new piano teacher from Kiev, influenced by the Russian school of piano. In 1964, Elisabeth Leonskaja won the Enesco International Piano Competition in Bucharest. The judges included the composer and conductor Aram Khachaturian and the pianist Arthur Rubinstein.

In 1964, Leonskaja began studies in the Moscow Conservatory. During her conservatory years she won prizes in the Enescu, Marguerite Long–Jacques Thibaud and Queen Elizabeth international piano competitions in Bucharest, Paris and Brussels.

Leonskaja left the Soviet Union in 1978 and has since then resided in Vienna. A notable recording of hers is of Edvard Grieg's piano transcriptions of Mozart's piano sonatas K. 545 and K. 533/494, accompanied by Sviatoslav Richter, with whom she built a close friendship and collaboration.  She recorded many years for Teldec, now for German label MD and gives many Masterclasses.

Decorations and awards
 Austrian Cross of Honour for Science and Art, 1st class (2005)
 Honorary citizen of Deutschlandsberg (1999)

References

External links
Elisabeth Leonskaja. Official site with official photos and biography
Q&A: Elisabeth Leonskaja (4 December 2010)

1945 births
Living people
Musicians from Tbilisi
Classical pianists from Georgia (country)
Women pianists from Georgia (country)
Russian classical pianists
Russian women pianists
Long-Thibaud-Crespin Competition prize-winners
Soviet classical pianists
20th-century classical pianists
Recipients of the Austrian Cross of Honour for Science and Art, 1st class
Jewish classical pianists
Russian women musicians
21st-century classical pianists
20th-century women pianists
21st-century women pianists